The 11th Tank Division was a Soviet tank division initially formed in 1940 at Tiraspol and destroyed in 1941; it was then formed as a tank corps in May 1942. This unit was subsequently reorganized as the second formation of the 11th Tank Division in 1945.

History

First Formation 
The first (1940) formation of the 11th Tank Division was subordinated to the 2nd Mechanized Corps, itself part of the 9th (independent) Army. The 11th Tank Division was destroyed near Novo-Arkhangelsk (Ukraine) in combat against the Germans in August 1941, with remnants escaping encirclement and being reorganized as the 132nd Tank Brigade, which later became the 4th Guards Tank Brigade.

11th Tank Corps 
Initiating a separate unit lineage, the 11th Tank Corps was formed on May 19, 1942. By June 1942, the 11th Tank Corps was subordinated to the Bryansk Front. Subordinate units at that time included the 53rd and 160th Tank Brigades, and the 12th Motor Rifle Brigade. The corps was never permanently attached to a tank army and was subordinated to several fronts during the course of the war.

11th Tank Corps was in combat near Kharkov in 1942, Orel in 1943, the offensive to drive the Germans from Belorussia in 1944, and the offensive across central Poland in January 1945.

As the Soviet Army approached victory in April 1945 during the Battle of Berlin, the 11th Tank Corps was part of the 1st Belorussian Front. It commanded the 20th, 36th, and 65th Tank Brigades, as well as the 12th Motor Rifle Brigade. During the battle, the corps was used to flank the Seelow Heights from the north, and in the advance into the city from the east.

Second Formation 
The 11th Tank Corps, like all Soviet tank corps, was reorganized as a division on 10 June 1945, and was renamed the 11th Tank Division.  The 11th Tank Division was part of the Group of Soviet Forces in Germany, subordinated to 1st Guards Tank Army from August of that year. It was soon transferred to the 3rd Shock Army.
 The division was relocated to Gusev, Kaliningrad Oblast in the Baltic Military District in early 1947. It was disbanded in February 1947, with its tank regiments becoming part of rifle divisions in the district and the 12th Motor Rifle Regiment, 243rd Mortar Regiment, 1388th Anti-Aircraft Artillery Regiment, 115th Guards Separate Mortar Battalion, 153rd Sapper Battalion, 687th Communications Battalion, 204th Medical-Sanitary Battalion, and 677th Motor Transport Battalion were all disbanded.

An 11th Guards Tank Corps also existed but was a different unit.

Commanders 
The following officers commanded the 11th Tank Corps during World War II:
 Major General Alexey Popov (19 May21 July 1942)
 Major General Ivan Lazerev (22 July 19427 June 1943)
 Major General Nikolai Radkevich (8 June21 October 1943)
 Major General Dmitry Gritsenko (22 October 194311 January 1944)
 Major General Filipp Rudkin (12 January14 July 1944)
 Major General Ivan Yushchuk (15 July 1944after 9 May 1945)

References

Citations

Bibliography 

Glantz, David, Stumbling Colossus: The Red Army on the Eve of World War, University Press of Kansas, 1998.
Glantz, David, Companion to Colossus Reborn, University Press of Kansas, 2005.
Poirier, Robert G., and Conner, Albert Z., The Red Army Order of Battle in the Great Patriotic War, Novato: Presidio Press, 1985.

Niehorster OB for 11th Tank Corps in 1945

011
011
Military units and formations established in 1940
Military units and formations disestablished in 1955
1940 establishments in the Soviet Union